is a 1992 Japanese film directed by Seijirō Kōyama. It is about the Japanese scientist Hideyo Noguchi. It is based on two biographical novels, Tōki Rakujitsu written by Junichi Watanabe and Noguchi no haha: Noguchi Hideo Monogatari written by Kaneto Shindō. The screenplay was written by Kaneto Shindō. It stars Hiroshi Mikami.

Cast
 Yoshiko Mita - Shika Noguchi
 Hiroshi Mikami - Noguchi
 Tatsuya Nakadai - Kobayashi
 Riho Makise - Yoneko Yamauchi
 Takahiro Tamura - Ryutaro
 Choichiro Kawarasaki
 Shingo Yamashiro - Watanabe
 Toshinori Omi
 Hiroyuki Nagato
 Kojiro Kusanagi
 Masumi Harukawa
 Julie Dreyfus - Mary

References

External links 
 

1992 films
Shochiku films
Films directed by Seijirō Kōyama
Films set in the Taishō period
1990s Japanese films